Victoriaville is a town in central Quebec, Canada, on the Nicolet River. Victoriaville is the seat of Arthabaska Regional County Municipality and a part of the Centre-du-Québec (Bois-Francs) region. It is formed by the 1993 merger of Arthabaska, Saint-Victoire-d'Arthabaska and Victoriaville, the name of the last being used for the merged town.

Description
Victoriaville's size and location have earned it the title Capitale des Bois-Francs, referring to the Bois-Francs region of the province. Victoriaville produces numerous hardwood products, including furniture, caskets, and hockey sticks.

The Parc-Linéaire Des Bois-Francs bike trail traverses Victoriaville. There are many paths for cyclists throughout the town, including ones leading to the summit of Mont Arthabaska, at the southern limits of the town. The Laurier Museum commemorates the summer home of Canadian former Prime Minister Sir Wilfrid Laurier and is a National Historic Site of Canada.

Many festivals are held throughout the year including the Week-end En Blues series of concerts, the Festival International de Musique Actuelle de Victoriaville (FIMAV) in the spring, and the Exposition Agricole in the summer.

Investment in the industrial park has buoyed the town and spurred new residential and commercial development. It is the home of a prominent Lactantia dairy factory, two shopping malls ("La Grande Place des Bois-Francs" and "Le Carrefour des Bois-Francs", this one has been renamed and became "le Centre de Victoriaville"), the Cégep de Victoriaville, and a quaint yet vibrant downtown core/shopping area on Rue Notre-Dame. Victoriaville Airport, located at the town's northern limits close to Route 116, is a regional airport that receives business flights and light private planes.

The current mayor of Victoriaville is Antoine Tardif who was elected as mayor of Victoriaville in the 2021 mayoral election.

Victoriaville is the seat of the judicial district of Arthabaska.

History

The Victoriaville area was known to the native Abenaki peoples as Arthabaska or Awabaska, meaning "place of bulrushes and reeds". The area was first claimed in 1802 by a fur trader named John Gregory; the first settlers began arriving several decades later, beginning around 1825. Early colonists from the banks of the Saint Lawrence River arrived slowly, blazing trails as they went; the first provincial road would be built in 1844. The parish of Saint-Christophe d'Arthabaska was established in 1851, an event that many see as marking the town's true foundation. In 1854 a train station was erected to serve the Grand Trunk Railway line from Richmond to Lévis, uniting the region with Montreal and Quebec City. The municipality of Victoriaville itself was created on May 8, 1861, named to honour Queen Victoria, the reigning monarch at the time. Victoriaville became a full-fledged town in 1890, having reached a population of 1,000.

Among the many milestones in the growth of Victoriaville are the establishment of a hospital, the Hôtel-Dieu d'Arthabaska, in 1931; the opening of a seminary, the Collège du Sacré-Coeur, in 1942; the creation of a school specialized in cabinet making and woodworking, the École Québécoise du Meuble et du Bois Ouvré (ÉQMBO), in 1965; and the inauguration of the Cégep de Victoriaville in the space previously occupied by the Collège du Sacré-Coeur, in 1969. Train service through Victoriaville was discontinued in 1960; the disused train tracks were eventually removed and the space was transformed into bicycle paths, forming the Parc Linéaire — with a "Vélogare" replacing the old station. In March 1941, the Royal Canadian Air Force (RCAF) established No. 3 Initial Training School, at the Collège du Sacré-Coeur. The RCAF school trained potential pilots and Navigators on common topics and divided the trainees into their trades. The RCAF school was closed in November 1944.

In June 1993, after a referendum on amalgamation, the municipalities of Sainte-Victoire-D'Arthabaska, Arthabaska and Victoriaville merged to form the town of Victoriaville. The aboriginal name "Arthabaska", unique and well-appreciated by residents, was retained in several ways, notably in the name of the regional county municipality and in the name of the highest (and only) mountain that overlooks the town; as well, in 2004, the section of Route 116 that passes through Victoriaville was renamed boulevard Arthabaska.

Economy
Textiles, wood products and furniture products have long been the heart of the economy, but their presence have declined in the past years. A large Lactantia factory producing butter, cheeses and other dairy products has been a major employer for decades. Water filtered from Réservoir Beaudet is said to be some of the best water worldwide.

Media
The weekly newspaper La Nouvelle-Union, is a major source of the town's local news, since national news organisations tend to run larger stories affecting larger areas or cities.

Two radio stations, CFJO ("O97,3") and CFDA ("Passion-Rock 101,9") serve Victoriaville. Both stations air programming produced partially in Victoriaville and partially in Thetford Mines. CKYQ ("KYQ FM"), a station licensed to Plessisville, also has a studio and a transmitter in Victoriaville.

Demographics 

Sports
Jean Béliveau (August 31, 1931 – December 2, 2014), ten-time Stanley Cup winner with the Montreal Canadiens, was raised in Victoriaville after moving there from Trois-Rivières at a young age.

The town is currently home to the Victoriaville Tigres junior hockey team, who have played in the QMJHL since 1987. They play at the Colisée Desjardins.

Notable residents
Sir Wilfrid Laurier, Canadian Prime Minister (1896–1911)
Édouard Richard, member of the House of Commons of Canada
Jean Béliveau, hockey player for the Montreal Canadiens (retired, Hall of Famer)
Sylvie Boucher, Conservative MP for the House of Commons of Canada
William Cloutier, pop singer and actor
René Corbet, hockey player for the Colorado Avalanche
Phillip Danault, hockey player for the Los Angeles Kings
Dumas, singer
François Labbé, businessman
Martin Laroche, film director
Marc Aurèle de Foy Suzor-Coté, painter and sculptor
Gilbert Perreault, hockey player for the Buffalo Sabres (retired, Hall of Famer)
Jonathan Goulet, professional mixed martial artist
Alex Labbé, professional Nascar driver
Esther Valiquette (1962 - 1994), documentary film director

See also
 Monarchy in Quebec

References

External links

Ville de Victoriaville 

 
Cities and towns in Quebec
Populated places established in 1993